Passow is a former municipality in the Uckermark district, in Brandenburg, Germany. Since 19 April 2022, it is an Ortsteil of the town Schwedt. The former municipality Passow also contained the Ortsteile Briest, Jamikow and Schönow.

Demography

References

Localities in Uckermark (district)
Former municipalities in Brandenburg
Schwedt